Castellón Airport  is a small general aviation airport in Castellón de la Plana, on the mid-east coast of Spain, about  north of Valencia.

References

Airports in Castellón
Airports in the Valencian Community